Daniel Hagen is an American voice, television, and film actor. He has had guest appearances on Seinfeld ("The Dealership"), CSI, Buffy the Vampire Slayer, Friends, Sabrina, the Teenage Witch, and Charmed. He has voice acted for Star Wars video games such as Star Wars: Bounty Hunter, Star Wars: X-Wing Alliance, Star Wars: Knights of the Old Republic. In other voice acting roles, he has voiced in the video games Area-51, Metal Gear Solid: Peace Walker, Ratchet & Clank Future: Tools of Destruction, Ratchet & Clank Future: A Crack in Time, Ratchet & Clank: Into the Nexus, Dishonored, and the Skylanders series and he did the voices in SpongeBob Moves In!.

Selected filmography

Film

Television

Videogames

External links

Year of birth missing (living people)
Living people
American male voice actors
Place of birth missing (living people)